Call Me is the seventh studio album by the American recording artist Sylvester.

Track listing

Singles

References 

1983 albums
Sylvester (singer) albums
Post-disco albums